Titánicos de León is a Mexican professional basketball team based in León, Guanajuato, that plays in the LNBP. The team was founded in 2014, and entered the LNBP for the first time in the 2014–15 season.

Notable players

References

External links
Official site

Basketball teams in Mexico
Sports teams in Guanajuato
León, Guanajuato
Basketball teams established in 2014
2014 establishments in Mexico